Peter Moore (February 21, 1944 – April 29, 2022) was an American designer who was a Creative Director at Nike and Adidas from the 1970s to the late 1990s. Moore is credited as the creator of the originally banned Air Jordan 1 silhouette and Nike Dunk silhouette. As a multidisciplinary designer, Peter Moore also created logos for the sneaker brands including the Air Jordan ball-and-wings logo, the Jumpman logo, and the Adidas mountain logo.

Education 
Moore attended Chouinard, now California Institute of the Arts, where he studied art and then graphic design.

Career 
Moore began working with Nike in 1977. He then left Nike in 1987 to join Adidas, and eventually established Adidas America in 1992.  Following the unexpected death of Rob Strasser in 1993, Moore served as Adidas' chief executive officer for a short period. In 1998, Moore left Adidas to focus on printmaking only to return again as a brand consultant for Adidas in 2013. He died on April 29, 2022.

References 

Nike, Inc. people
Designers
1944 births
2022 deaths